Yassin El-Azzouzi (born 13 January 1983) is a French-Moroccan former professional footballer who played as a striker.

Career
El-Azzouzi scored 8 goals in 17 Ligue 2 matches for SC Bastia in the 2010–11 campaign.

After making few appearances in the first half of the 2012–13 season under coach Frédéric Hantz at Bastia, he was linked with Chamois Niortais with media reporting him having passed medical examination at the club. However, Niort failed to agree terms over a contract with El-Azzouzi. He decided to end his career at the age of 30 in summer 2013.

References

External links
 
 

1983 births
Living people
People from Lunel
Sportspeople from Hérault
French sportspeople of Moroccan descent
French footballers
Moroccan footballers
Footballers from Occitania (administrative region)
Association football forwards
Ligue 1 players
Ligue 2 players
Montpellier HSC players
ÉF Bastia players
Nîmes Olympique players
RCO Agde players
FC Montceau Bourgogne players
Pacy Ménilles RC players
SC Bastia players